Saihou Gassama (born 11 December 1993) is a Gambian footballer who plays for Spanish club SD Borja as a right midfielder.

Club career
Gassama began his career on homeland's club Gambia Ports Authority F.C. but moved to Spain in 2009, signing a contract with Real Zaragoza after impressing on a trial. He was subsequently loaned to Tercera División club RSD Santa Isabel in the 2010–11 season.

Gassama returned to the Aragonese side in the 2011 summer being assigned to the reserves in Segunda División B. On 1 September 2013 he moved to fellow league team CD Sariñena, after suffering relegation in the previous campaign.

On 18 July 2014 Gassama joined SD Huesca, also in the third level. He appeared in 19 matches and scored one goal during his first and only season, as his side returned to Segunda División after a two-year absence.

International career
He was called to Gambia national football team, after a successful period with under-20's. He made his international debut on 2 June 2012, against Morocco. He scored his first goal on the 15th, against Algeria.

References

External links

1993 births
Living people
Sportspeople from Banjul
Gambian footballers
Association football midfielders
Gambia Ports Authority FC players
Real Zaragoza B players
SD Huesca footballers
Lorca FC players
CD Izarra footballers
SD Tarazona footballers
Segunda División B players
Tercera División players
The Gambia youth international footballers
The Gambia international footballers
Gambian expatriate footballers
Gambian expatriate sportspeople in Spain
Expatriate footballers in Spain